Ayşen Gruda (22 August 1944 – 23 January 2019) was a Turkish actress and comedian.

Biography
Ayşen Gruda was born on 22 August 1944 in Istanbul. Her sisters Ayten and Ayben also went on to become actresses.

Gruda appeared in several musicals such as "Mum Söndü", "Deve Kuşu Kabare", "Hababam Sınıfı Müzikali", and "Yedi Kocalı Hürmüz". Her role in the sketch Her Domates Güzeli Nahide Şerbet on television, gained her the nickname "Domates Güzeli". She appeared in over 100 films, including such classic movies as; Tosun Paşa, Süt Kardeşler, Gülen Gözler, Şabanoğlu Şaban, Hababam Sınıfı, and Neşeli Günler.

Gruda died on 23 January 2019 of pancreatic cancer in Istanbul at the age of 74. She was interred at the Zincirlikuyu Cemetery. She was survived by her sisters Ayten Erman and Ayben Erman, former spouse Yılmaz Gruda, daughter Elvan Gruda and grandson Emre Gruda.

References

External links
 

1944 births
Actresses from Istanbul
Turkish comedians
Turkish stage actresses
Turkish film actresses
Turkish television actresses
Best Supporting Actress Golden Orange Award winners
20th-century Turkish actresses
Deaths from cancer in Turkey
Deaths from pancreatic cancer
2019 deaths
Burials at Zincirlikuyu Cemetery
20th-century comedians
Turkish women comedians